Victor Söderström may refer to:
 Victor Söderström (ice hockey) (born 2001)
 Victor Söderström (footballer) (born 1994)